The Muker are a  Muslim community, found in North India  and Nepal. They  are also known as Mukeri, Mekrani, Makrani, Barmaki, Ranki and Mukri.

Present circumstances
The Mukeri were historically a part of the Banjara community of nomadic merchants and transporters. Whilst many Banjara groups would deal in any goods that might make a profit, the Mukeris specialised in the transport of wood and timber. Many are now settled agriculturalists. The community are Muslim of the Sunni sect. They have their own tribal association, the International Mukeri Tanzeem.

References

Social groups of Uttar Pradesh
Social groups of Nepal
Social groups of Pakistan
Muslim communities of Uttar Pradesh
Muslim communities of Bihar
Ethnic groups in Nepal
Social groups of Bihar
Banjara people